Timur Mamedovich Dzhabrailov (born 5 August 1973) is a retired Russian footballer of Chechen ethnicity who played for FC Terek Grozny and was its captain in 2001–2010. After retirement, he was appointed club's director of sports.

References 

1973 births
Living people
Russian footballers
Russian people of Chechen descent
FC Akhmat Grozny players
FC Angusht Nazran players
Russian Premier League players
Chechen people

Association football defenders